Russ or Russell Anderson may refer to:

Russ Anderson (born 1959), American ice hockey player in the NHL
Russell Anderson (born 1978), Scottish footballer
Russell A. Anderson (1942–2020), American judge
Russell Anderson (politician) (born 1951), Australian politician